UBS Securities Co., Ltd. is the investment bank and brokerage firm of the Swiss bank UBS with offices in many countries, amont the China. Its Chinese arm is a joint-venture according to the restrictions of foreign investments in China, especially in the financial sector. Since 2018, it is a subsidiary of the Swiss bank UBS.

History

In 2006, China Jianyin Investment (an indirect subsidiary of the State Council) and Beijing Guoxiang Asset Management (an asset management subsidiary of the ) established the firm after the financial difficulties of Beijing Securities.  UBS and the International Finance Corporation bought a combined 24.99% share of the enterprise in 2007, under the laws governing Sino-foreign joint ventures. COFCO Group and State Development & Investment Corporation (SDIC) also acquired part ownership from China Jianyin Investment.

The firm began operations in May of 2007. It underwrote BYD Company, Pang Da Automobile Trade and other publicly traded companies in their IPO. In 2011, China Guodian acquired the SDIC's 14% stake and China Jianyin Investment sold its remaining 14.01% stake to its parent company, Central Huijin Investment, which was in turn acquired in 2013 by the -owned . One year later, UBS increased its stake from 20% to 24.99% by acquiring International Finance Corporation's share.

UBS Securities became a subsidiary of UBS in 2015. The latter company increased its share to 51% by acquiring additional stake from China Guodian and COFCO Group. Beijing Guoxiang Asset Management's stake in UBS Securities is now (as of 2019) owned by sister company Beijing State-owned Assets Management.

See also
 CSC Financial, a sister company
 Securities industry in China

References

Footnotes

External links
 

UBS
Financial services companies of China
Investment banks in China
Investment management companies of China
Government-owned companies of China
Companies owned by the provincial government of China
Financial services companies established in 2006
Banks established in 2006
Chinese companies established in 2006
Companies based in Beijing